A kōauau is a small flute, ductless and notchless,  long, open at both ends and having from three to six fingerholes placed along the pipe.

Kōauau resemble flutes the world over both in tone quality and in the range of sounds that can be produced by directing the breath across the sharp edge of the upper aperture. Māori kōauau players were renowned for the power it gave them over the affections of women (notably illustrated by the story of Tūtānekai, who, by playing his kōauau, convinced Hinemoa to swim to him across Lake Rotorua). Kōauau are made of wood or bone. Formerly the bone was of bird bone such as albatross or moa; some instruments were also of human bone and were associated with chiefly status and with the cultural practice of utu.

External links
 Kōauau in the collection of the Museum of New Zealand Te Papa Tongarewa

End-blown flutes
Māori musical instruments